Zsolt Szabó (born October 20, 1963) is a Hungarian agronomist and politician, member of the National Assembly (MP) for Hatvan (Heves County Constituency IV then III) since 2010. He was also mayor of the town from 2010 to 2014. Szabó was appointed Secretary of State for Development, Climate Policy and Priority Public Services in the Ministry of National Development on June 15, 2014, holding the office until May 17, 2018.

He was elected Vice Chairman of the Committee on Consumer Protection on May 14, 2010, holding the position until May 5, 2014. He was a member then vice-chairman of the Legislative Committee for a short time in May–June 2014, until his appointment as state secretary. He is a member of the Committee on Budgets since June 4, 2018.

On 23 March 2018, daily Magyar Nemzet reported that Szabó and his wife own an offshore company in Belize. Its bank account contained $4,8 million.

References

1963 births
Living people
Hungarian agronomists
Fidesz politicians
Mayors of places in Hungary
Members of the National Assembly of Hungary (2010–2014)
Members of the National Assembly of Hungary (2014–2018)
Members of the National Assembly of Hungary (2018–2022)
Members of the National Assembly of Hungary (2022–2026)
People from Eger